Charles Henry Thomas Ricketts (3 July 1885 – 7 March 1960) was an Australian rules footballer and coach in the Victorian Football League.

Ricketts was a champion rover for the Richmond Football Club in the Victorian Football Association from 1903 to 1905.  He represented the VFA twice in 1905 and kicked two goals in the Richmond premiership side.

The next season, he crossed to the South Melbourne Football Club in the Victorian Football League. He was considered a highly skilled player noted for his accuracy, particularly with his stab-kick passes. By 1908 he had earned a reputation as one of the premier players in the VFL and the following season he led South Melbourne to their first League premiership as captain-coach. Despite this success he was replaced as captain-coach for 1910 by William Thomas, but he regained his position for 1912, leading South Melbourne to a (losing) VFL Grand Final. For 1913 he was again denied the opportunity to captain the side by the disapproving South committee (despite winning the vote).

Ricketts moved back to Richmond, who were now in the VFL, for the 1913 and 1914 seasons before taking the reins as a non-playing coach for 1915 and 1916. After a hiatus from the VFL due to World War I, Ricketts coached St Kilda for the 1920 season and was playing coach in 1921. Following this, he retired from VFL football.

References 

 Hogan P: The Tigers Of Old, Richmond FC, Melbourne 1996

1960 deaths
1885 births
Sydney Swans players
Sydney Swans Premiership players
Sydney Swans coaches
Sydney Swans Premiership coaches
Richmond Football Club players
Richmond Football Club coaches
St Kilda Football Club players
St Kilda Football Club coaches
Richmond Football Club (VFA) players
Australian rules footballers from Geelong
One-time VFL/AFL Premiership players
One-time VFL/AFL Premiership coaches
Australian rules footballers from Melbourne